My Journey may refer to:

Books
My Journey, autobiography of Irish Australian rules footballer Jim Stynes, 2012
Guantanamo: My Journey, autobiography of Australian internee David Hicks

Film and TV
My Journey, episode of Scrubs (season 3)

Music

Albums
My Journey (Karise Eden album), a 2012 album
My Journey (Shila Amzah album), a 2016 album
My Journey 1999 album by Swedish singer Pernilla Andersson
My Journey, Gospel album by Gina Green 2008

Songs
"My Journey", song by electronic artist Jean Claude Ades
"On My Journey", song by The Weavers, version of "On My Journey Now" by Paul Robeson